High School Moms is an American reality television series on TLC. The series debuted on August 12, 2012. Encores of the series air on Discovery Fit & Health.

Premise
The series follows the daily lives of those who work and attend Florence Crittenton High School, a school that exclusively caters to teenage mothers and currently pregnant girls.

Episodes

See also
 Teen Mom
 Teen Mom 2

References

External links
 
 

2010s American high school television series
2010s American reality television series
2012 American television series debuts
2012 American television series endings
English-language television shows
TLC (TV network) original programming
Television series about teenagers
Television shows set in Colorado